HMS Harrier was a schooner of the Royal Navy. Built at Cowes, Isle of Wight and launched in 1872. She was bought by the Royal Navy for £2874 and named HMS Harrier.

Initially in use for policing the East Africa slave trade, she commenced service on the Australia Station in September 1883. Undertaking some survey work, she was paid off in 1888 and she was sold in Sydney to the London Missionary Society for £1200.

Harrier was wrecked upon F Reef, Great Barrier Reef, near Cooktown in July 1891.

Citations

References
Bastock, John (1988), Ships on the Australia Station, Child & Associates Publishing Pty Ltd; Frenchs Forest, Australia.

External links

1872 ships
Ships built on the Isle of Wight
Schooners of the Royal Navy
Shipwrecks of Queensland
Maritime incidents in 1891